Pseudoganisa is a genus of moths in the family Eupterotidae.

Species
 Pseudoganisa currani Schultze, 1910
 Pseudoganisa gonioptera (West, 1932)

References

Eupterotinae
Moth genera